is a passenger railway station in the city of Maebashi, Gunma Prefecture, Japan, operated by the private railway operator Jōmō Electric Railway Company.

Lines

Station layout
The station consists of a single island platform with a level crossing. The station is not attended.

Platforms

Adjacent stations

History
Mitsumata Station opened as a signal stop on November 10, 1928. It was relocated 300 meters towards Nishi-Kiryū Station on August 25, 1956 and elevated to a full station.

Surrounding area
Maebashi Mitsumata Post Office

See also
 List of railway stations in Japan

External links

  
	

Stations of Jōmō Electric Railway
Railway stations in Gunma Prefecture
Railway stations in Japan opened in 1956
Maebashi